Ayn al-Tineh is a Syrian village in the Safita District in Tartus Governorate. According to the Syria Central Bureau of Statistics (CBS), Ayn al-Tineh had a population of 818 in the 2004 census.

References

Alawite communities in Syria
Populated places in Safita District